Edith Beatrice Belcher Thurston (died April 1, 1970) was a Canadian politician, who was elected to the Legislative Assembly of Alberta in the 1944 provincial election. She was a member of the Alberta Social Credit Party.

References

Alberta Social Credit Party MLAs
Women MLAs in Alberta
1970 deaths
20th-century Canadian politicians
20th-century Canadian women politicians